Ourapteryx variolaria is a moth of the family Geometridae. It is found in Taiwan.

References

Moths described in 1985
Ourapterygini
Moths of Taiwan